Michael Robert Otucan Baldisimo (born April 13, 2000) is a Canadian professional soccer player who plays as a defensive midfielder for Major League Soccer club San Jose Earthquakes.

Early life
Baldisimo began playing soccer at age four with Wesburn Youth SC. Afterwards, he played with South Burnaby Metro Club, Mountain United FC, and Burnaby Metro Selects SC. In 2011, he represented Western Canada at the Danone Cup qualifiers. Later in 2011, he joined the Vancouver Whitecaps FC Academy. He was named the 2018 Whitecaps FC Most Promising Player at the club's annual awards ceremony.

Club career 
On August 4, 2016, he made his professional debut in the USL with Whitecaps FC 2 as an academy call-up in a match against Arizona United SC. He attended the 2017 pre-season with the Vancouver Whitecaps FC first team. In March 2017, he signed a professional contract with Whitecaps FC 2 in the USL.

In July 2018, Baldisimo signed a homegrown player contract with Vancouver Whitecaps FC in Major League Soccer. After not featuring for the team in 2018 or 2019, he began to feature regularly with the team in 2020. He made his debut for the first team on August 25, 2020, starting in a 2–0 away defeat to the Montreal Impact. He scored his first goal the following week on September 5, in a 3–2 home victory over Toronto FC. 

After the 2022 season, following the expiry of his contract, he was selected by the San Jose Earthquakes in the 2022 MLS Re-Entry Draft. In January 2023, he signed a one year contract with a club option for 2024 with the Earthquakes.

International career
Baldisimo was born in Canada and is of Filipino descent.

Canada
In October 2014, he made his debut in the Canadian program when he was called up to a camp with the Canada U15 national team. In the summer of 2015, he was named to the U15 squad for a tournament in Mexico. In 2017, he was named to the Canada U17 team for the 2017 CONCACAF U-17 Championship. He was called up to the Canada U21 team for the 2018 Toulon Tournament and also made three starts for the Canada U20 team at the 2018 CONCACAF U-20 Championship, recording an assist against Dominica U20. In March 2021,  Baldisimo was named to the Canadian U23 squad for the 2020 CONCACAF Men's Olympic Qualifying Championship. In June 2021, he was named to the 60-man provisional squad for the 2021 CONCACAF Gold Cup, but was left off the final team.

Philippines
In May 2021, Baldisimo received an invitation to play for the Philippines senior national team in their 2022 FIFA World Cup Asian qualifiers, however he declined the offer as he was still expecting to receive a call up from the Canadian senior team.  In November 2021, he accepted a call-up to the Philippines for the re-scheduled 2020 AFF Championship tournament, but had to withdraw due to injury. He accepted another invite to train with the team in November 2022.

Career statistics

Personal
He is the younger brother of Matthew Baldisimo, who is also a professional soccer player.

References

External links 

 

2000 births
Living people
Association football defenders
Canadian soccer players
Canadian sportspeople of Filipino descent
Soccer players from Vancouver
USL Championship players
Whitecaps FC 2 players
Vancouver Whitecaps FC players
San Jose Earthquakes players
Major League Soccer players
Homegrown Players (MLS)
Canada men's under-23 international soccer players
21st-century Canadian people
MLS Next Pro players